Mohammad Arif (born; 16 November 1972) is a Pakistani politician from Charsadda who was a member of the Provincial Assembly of Khyber Pakhtunkhwa from May 2013 to May 2018 and from August 2018 to January 2023. He served as chair and as a member of different committees.

Political career
Arif was elected as the member of the Khyber Pakhtunkhwa Assembly on ticket of Pakistan Tehreek-e-Insaf from PK-22 (Charsadda-VI) in 2013 Pakistani general election.

References

1972 births
Living people
Pashtun people
Pakistan Tehreek-e-Insaf MPAs (Khyber Pakhtunkhwa)
Khyber Pakhtunkhwa MPAs 2013–2018
People from Charsadda District, Pakistan